John Charles Ross (4 April 1892 – 7 June 1973) was an Australian rules footballer who played with Geelong in the Victorian Football League (VFL).

He served in both World War I and World War II.

Notes

External links 

1892 births
1973 deaths
Australian rules footballers from Victoria (Australia)
Geelong Football Club players
Chilwell Football Club players